Torpedo defence includes evasive maneuvers, passive defense like torpedo belts, torpedo nets, torpedo bulges and active defenses, like anti-torpedo torpedoes similar in idea to missile defense systems. Surface Ship Torpedo Defense and Countermeasure Anti-Torpedo systems are highly experimental and the US Navy ended trials on them in 2018.

References

Torpedoes
Naval warfare tactics